Rajabhau Waje  is an Indian politician, from Sinnar Nashik District. He was Member of the 13th Maharashtra Legislative Assembly from Sinnar Vidhan Sabha constituency as member of  Shiv Sena. He belongs to a political family and his grandfather Shankar Balaji Waje was first Maharashtra Legislative Assembly Member from Sinnar post the formation of state of Maharashtra. His grandmother  Rukminibai Waje was 1st female MLA of Sinnar (Vidhan Sabha constituency) in the year 1967. His father Prakash Waje also contested 2009 Maharashtra Legislative Assembly election from Sinnar (Vidhan Sabha constituency).

Rajabhau Waje has supported farmers cause and has led many agitations.

Positions held

 2014: Elected to Maharashtra Legislative Assembly
 2014: Elected to Panchayati Raj Samiti, A committee of Maharashtra Legislative Assembly
 2014: Elected to Grahak Sanrakshak Parishad, A committee of Maharashtra Legislative Assembly
 2017: Elected to Anusuchit Jamati Kalyan Samiti, A committee of Maharashtra Legislative Assembly
 2017: Elected to Anusuchit Jamati Kalyan Samiti, A committee of Maharashtra Legislative Assembly

See also
 Nashik Lok Sabha constituency

References

External links
 Shiv Sena Official website

Shiv Sena politicians
Maharashtra MLAs 2014–2019
Living people
People from Nashik district
Marathi politicians
1965 births